Androp (anne-drop, stylized as androp) is a Japanese rock band formed in 2008 in Tokyo. The band had their indie debut in 2009, and then signed on to a major label Warner Music Japan in 2011. Before their major debut, in November 2010 they contributed to the actress and singer Kou Shibasaki’s single “EUPHORIA”.

History
The band was formed in 2008 around the vocalist, Uchisawa Takahito.

Band members
 Uchisawa Takahito (内澤崇仁) – vocals, guitar
 Satou Takuya (佐藤拓也) – guitar, keyboards
 Maeda Kyosuke (前田恭介) – bass guitar
 Ito Akihiko (伊藤彬彦) – drums

Discography

Albums

Singles

References

External links
 Official website
 

Japanese rock music groups
Warner Music Japan artists